Outi is a Finnish female given name, of Karelian and Eastern Finnish origin.

It became popular around the middle of the 20th century, and it reached the peak of its popularity in the 1960s and 1970s. There are more than 11,000 people registered in Finland with this name. The name means one who has good intentions.

Notable people
 Outi Alanko-Kahiluoto, a Finnish politician 
 Outi Alanne, a Finnish writer, also known as NeitiNaru
 Outi Borgenström-Anjala, a Finnish orienteering competitor
 Outi Mäenpää, a Finnish television actress

References

Finnish feminine given names